Hakizimana is a surname. Notable people with the surname include:

 Hassan Hakizimana (born 1990), Burundian former footballer
 Issa Hakizimana (born 1994), Burundian footballer
 Jean Hakizimana (born 1985), Burundian footballer
 John Hakizimana (born 1996), Rwandan long-distance runner
 Muhadjiri Hakizimana (born 1994), Rwandan footballer
 Parfait Hakizimana (born 1988), Burundian parataekwondo practitioner
 Pascal Hakizimana (born 1993), Burundian footballer